Wolfgang Wahl (3 December 1925 – 15 September 2006) was a German actor. He appeared in more than one hundred films from 1953 to 1996.

Filmography

References

External links 

1925 births
2006 deaths
German male film actors
German male television actors
20th-century German male actors